The Montreal World Film Festival (WFF) was one of Canada's oldest international film festivals and the only competitive film festival in North America accredited by the FIAPF (although the Toronto International Film Festival is North America's only accredited non-competitive festival). The public festival, which was founded in 1977 as a replacement for the defunct Montreal International Film Festival (1960–68), is held annually in late August in the city of Montreal in Quebec.  Unlike the Toronto International Film Festival, which has a greater focus on Canadian and other North American films, the Montreal World Film Festival has a larger diversity of films from all over the world.  The festival was cancelled in 2019.

In 2022, former festival president Serge Losique announced plans to revive the festival as the Global Montreal Film Festival, with a 2022 edition featuring free screenings of a selection of films that had previously screened at FFM, leading to a full revival of the festival in 2023.

Festival

Programmes
The World Film Festival is organised in various sections:
World Competition (features and shorts)
First Films World Competition (features)
Out of Competition (features)
Focus on World Cinema (features and Shorts)
Documentaries of the World (features, medium-length films, shorts)
Tributes
Cinema Under the Stars
Student Film Festival (Canadian and international shorts)
Chinese films (permanent from 2017)

Juries
Prior to the beginning of each event, the Festival's board of directors appoints the juries who hold sole responsibility for choosing which films will receive the blessing of a WFF award. Jurors are chosen from a wide range of international artists, based on their body of work and respect from their peers.

Awards
Competition
Grand Prix des Amériques
Special Grand Prix of the jury
Best Director
Best Actress
Best Actor
Best Screenplay
Best Artistic Contribution
Innovation Award
Zenith Award for The Best First Fiction Feature Film, (Golden, Silver and Bronze)
Short Films (1st Prize and Jury Prize)

In addition the festival-going public votes for the films they liked best in different categories:
People's Choice Award
Award for the Most Popular Canadian Film
Glauber Rocha Award for the Best Film from Latin America
Best Documentary Film Award
Best Canadian Short Film Award.

Grand Prix des Amériques winners

Golden Zenith winners for The Best Feature Film in competition First Films World Competition

History
The stated goal of the Montreal World Film Festival (Montreal International Film Festival) is to:
 encourage cultural diversity and understanding between nations, to foster the cinema of all continents by stimulating the development of quality cinema, to promote filmmakers and innovative works, to discover and encourage new talents, and to promote meetings between cinema professionals from around the world.

The president of the Montreal World Film Festival (WFF) is Serge Losique; its vice-president is
Danièle Cauchard.  Losique's management has been controversial.  The WFF lost the sponsorship of its previous government cultural funders, SODEC and Telefilm Canada as a result of disagreements with Losique in 2004.  Subsequently, these two funding agencies announced that they would support a new international film festival, called the New Montreal FilmFest (FIFM), to be managed by Spectra Entertainment and headed by Daniel Langlois (of SoftImage and Ex-Centris and the Festival du Nouveau Cinéma).  After the inaugural edition of that new festival was unsuccessful, it was abandoned early in 2006. As of July 2007, Losique's lawsuits against  the funding agencies were dropped, paving the way for a restoration of government funding.

Impact
According to a survey by Léger Marketing:
Approximately 385,000 attended the 2008 World Film Festival. Of these, 323,352 (84%) were local filmgoers and 61,591 (16%) were out-of-town visitors.
Among visitors, 27% were less than 35 years old, 34% were 35 to 54 years old and 39% were more than 54 years old.
During their stay in the greater Montreal area, visitors attracted here by the Festival spent an average of $921.60. Visitors from outside the province spent on average twice as much as visitors from Quebec, and this money was spent specifically within the framework of their attendance at the Festival.
Tourist spending generated by visitors to the Montreal World Film Festival is estimated at $21 million.

Controversy
In 2005, Losique first announced and later withdrew the film Karla from the WFF after the principal sponsor of the festival, Air Canada, threatened to withdraw its sponsorship of the festival if that film were included.  The film — about Karla Homolka, a young woman who was convicted of manslaughter and who served twelve years in prison for her part in the kidnapping, sex-enslavement, rapes and murders of teenage girls, including her own sister, in a case said to involve ephebophilia — was controversial in Canada, with many calling for its boycott throughout the country.

In 2015 a group of employees claimed they were not paid.

In 2016 many of the employees resigned citing poor leadership and financial uncertainty amongst other issues. In an interview with CTV News, Gazette entertainment columnist Bill Brownstein referred to Losique as having a "Napoleonic complex" and not "playing well with the other children" resulting in government and sponsors withdrawing their funding support.

In 2019, the WFF announced that it is cancelling the 43rd edition of the event, leaving behind speculations about its later continuation.

See also
 Fantasia International Film Festival (FanTasia)
 SODEC
 Telefilm Canada
 Toronto International Film Festival (TIFF)

Notes

References
 Alioff, Maurie.  "Montreal World Film Festival." Take One.  Dec. 2004.  FindArticles.com.  Accessed 1 Sept. 2006.
 Kelly, Brendan.  World Film Festival staggers into 30th year.  Montreal Gazette.  9 Aug. 2006.  Accessed 1 Sept. 2006.
 Montreal Film Fest Might Fade to Black."  CBC 30 July 2004, Arts & Entertainment.  Accessed 1 Sept. 2006.
 "Montreal Film Fest Sues Telefilm to Stop Proposed New Festival." CBC 15 Dec. 2004, Arts & Entertainment.  Accessed 1 Sept. 2006.
 "Montreal Jazz Fest Organizers Chosen to Create New Film Fest." CBC 17 Dec. 2004, Arts & Entertainment.  Accessed 1 Sept. 2006.
 "Quebec Gov't Questions SODEC over Failed FilmFest." CBC 24 Feb. 2006, Arts & Entertainment.  Accessed 1 Sept. 2006.

External links
 

Film festivals in Montreal
Film festivals established in 1977
August events
Defunct film festivals in Canada